Qabr Hud , or Shiʽb Hūd, is a village situated in the Yemeni Governorate of Hadhramaut. It is the traditional burial site of the Islamic prophet Hud, who is mentioned in the Qur'an.

Pilgrimage

The annual pilgrimage takes place between the 11th and 15th days of Sha'ban.

Robert Bertram Serjeant, in his study of the pilgrimage rite to the tomb of Hud, verified on the spot the facts related by Al-Harawi, who described at the gate of the Mosque, on the west side, the rock onto which Hud climbed to make the call to prayer, and mentioned the grotto of Balhut at the bottom of the ravine. Around the tomb and neighborhood, various ancient ruins and inscriptions have been found.

Geography

References

External links
 نيل المقصود في مشروعية زيارة نبي الله هود عليه السلام (book in Arabic)
 Maqam of Prophet Hud (عليه السلام), Yemen
 View from Prophet Hud's grave (YouTube)

Populated places in Hadhramaut Governorate
Ziyarat
Archaeological sites in Yemen